Rivash may refer to:

 Rabbi Israel Baal Shem Tov (1698–1760), the founder of Chassidic movement
 Rabbi Isaac ben Sheshet (1328–1408), a Spanish Talmudic authority
 Rivash, Iran, a city in Iran